Valley Forge National Historical Park is the site of the third winter encampment of the Continental Army during the American Revolutionary War, taking place from December 19, 1777, to June 19, 1778. The National Park Service preserves the site and interprets the history of the Valley Forge encampment.  Originally Valley Forge State Park, it became a national historical park in 1976.  The park contains historical buildings, recreated encampment structures, memorials, museums, and recreation facilities.

The park encompasses  and is visited by over 1.2 million people each year. Visitors can see restored historic structures, reconstructed structures such as the iconic log huts, and monuments erected by the states from which the Continental soldiers came. Visitor facilities include a visitor center and museum featuring original artifacts, providing a concise introduction to the American Revolution and the Valley Forge encampment. Ranger programs, tours (walking and trolley), and activities are available seasonally. The park also provides  of hiking and biking trails, which are connected to a robust regional trails system. Wildlife watching, fishing, and boating on the nearby Schuylkill River also are popular.

Historical encampment

[[File:Washington and Lafayette.jpg|thumb|An illustration of Washington and Lafayette at Valley Forge
From December 19, 1777, to June 19, 1778, the main body of the Continental Army, which included approximately 12,000 troops, was encamped at Valley Forge. It was a time of great suffering for the Continental Army, but it was also a time of retraining and rejuvenation. The shared hardship of the officers and soldiers of the army, combined with Baron Friedrich von Steuben's professional military training program, are considered key to the subsequent success of the Continental Army and mark a turning point in the Revolutionary War.

Park history
Valley Forge was established as the first state park of Pennsylvania in 1893 by the Valley Forge Park Commission (VFPC) "to preserve, improve, and maintain as a public park the site on which General George Washington's army encamped at Valley Forge." The area around Washington's Headquarters was chosen as the park site. In 1923, the VFPC was brought under the Department of Forests and Waters and later incorporated into the Pennsylvania Historical and Museum Commission in 1971.

The park served as the location of the National Scout Jamboree in 1950, 1957, and 1964.

Valley Forge was designated a U.S. National Historic Landmark in 1961 and was listed in the initial National Register of Historic Places in 1966.  The area covered by these listings goes outside what was the Valley Forge State Park boundaries to include four historic houses where the Marquis de Lafayette and other officers were quartered.

In 1976, Pennsylvania gave the park as a gift to the nation for the Bicentennial. The U.S. Congress passed a law signed by President Gerald Ford on July 4, 1976, authorizing the addition of Valley Forge National Historical Park as the 283rd Unit of the National Park System. In addition to establishing Valley Forge National Park, the law also allocated an initial budget of $8,622,000 and an additional $500,000 for essential facilities.

The Centennial and Memorial Association of Valley Forge, led by Founding Regent Anna Morris Holstein, was incorporated in 1878 with the purpose of saving, acquiring, preserving General Washington’s Headquarters and immediate surrounding acreage. A large Centennial event to create awareness and raise funds was held on June 19, 1878, the 100th anniversary of Washington’s Army exiting Valley Forge. Funds were raised to purchase the home from Hannah Ogden in May 1878. The Centennial and Memorial efforts continued to help acquire original artifacts, restore the Headquarters and acquire additional parcels of immediate surrounding acreage.

Park Superintendents

State Park Superintendents 

 Frederick D. Stone (1893 – 1895)
 Holstein DeHaven (1895 – 1898)
 Charles C. Adams (1899 – 1903)
 A.H. Bowen (1903 – 1911)
 Col. S.S. Hartranft (1911 – 1921)
 John S. Kennedy (1921 – 1924)
 Jerome J. Sheas (1925 – 1935)
 Gilbert S. Jones (1935 – 1938)
 Joseph E. Stott (1938 – 1940)
 E.F. Brouse (1940 – 1941)
 L. Ralph Phillips (1941 – 1953)
 Paul E. Felton (1953 – 1955)
 George F. Kenworthy (1955 – 1957)
 Wilford P. Moll (1957 – 1958)
 E.C. Pyle (1958 – 1966)
 Wilford P. Moll (1966 – 1969)
 Charles C. Frost, Jr. (1969 – 1971)
 Horace Wilcox (1971 – 1976)

National Park Superintendents 

 H. Gilbert Lusk (1976 – 1981)
 Wallace Elms (1981 – 1990)
 Warren Beach (1990 – 1996)
 Arthur L. Stewart (1996 – 2004)
 Mike Caldwell (2004 – 2011)
 Kate Hammond (2012 – 2016)
 Steven Sims (2017 – 2019)
 Rose Fennell (2020 – Present)

Features and facilities

Visitor center

The park's visitor center includes a museum with artifacts found during excavations of the park, an interactive muster roll of Continental soldiers encamped at Valley Forge, ranger-led gallery programs and walks, a storytelling program, a photo gallery, a visitor information desk, and a store for books and souvenirs.

90-minute bus tours of the park and bike rentals are available seasonally. A short 18-minute film, "Valley Forge: A Winter Encampment" is shown in the park's theater next door. The visitor center, built in 1976, underwent a renovation starting in 2018 that was nearing completion in mid 2021, by which time it was partially reopened. During renovation visitor center operations moved to a temporary visitor center, located in the parking lot of the existing facility. The second phase of the opening, slated for fall of 2021, will include a new theater building and new interpretative and museum exhibits.

Headquarters buildings

A key attraction of the park is the restored colonial home used by General George Washington as his headquarters during the encampment.  Rehabilitation of the headquarters area was completed in summer 2009, and included the restoration of the old Valley Forge train station into an information center, new guided tours, new exhibits throughout the landscape, and the elimination of several acres of modern paving and restoration of the historic landscape.  Quarters of other Continental Army generals are also in the park, including those of Huntington, Varnum, Lord Stirling, Lafayette, and Knox.  Varnum's quarters is open on weekends during the summer.

Reconstructed works and buildings

Throughout the park there are reconstructed log cabins of the type thought to be used during the encampment.  Earthworks for the defense of the encampment are visible, including four redoubts, the ditch for the Inner Line Defenses, and a reconstructed abatis.  The original redoubts and several redans on Route 23, Outer Line Drive, and Inner Line Drive were covered with sod to preserve them, but they are currently in need of further restoration.  The original forges, located on Valley Creek, were burned by the British three months prior to Washington's occupation of the park area.  However, neither the Upper Forge site nor the Lower Forge site has been reconstructed.  There are also several historical buildings that have not been made open to the public because of reasons such as their current state of disrepair.  These include: Lord Stirling's Quarters, Knox's Quarters, and the Von Steuben Memorial.  Other historical buildings include the P.C. Knox Estate, Kennedy-Supplee Mansion and Potts' Barn.

Washington Memorial Chapel

The Washington Memorial Chapel and National Patriots Bell Tower carillon sit atop a hill at the center of the present park.  The chapel is the legacy of W. Herbert Burk.  Inspired by Burk's 1903 sermon on Washington's birthday, the chapel is a functioning Episcopal Church, built as a tribute to Washington.  Burk was also instrumental in the development of the park, including obtaining Washington's campaign tent and banner, which used to be on display in the visitor center but is now in the Museum of the American Revolution in Philadelphia.  The chapel and attached bell tower are not technically part of the park but serve the spiritual needs of the park and the community that surround it.  The bell tower houses the Daughters of the American Revolution Patriot Rolls, listing those that served in the Revolutionary War, and the chapel grounds hosted the World of Scouting Museum.

Memorial markers

Sitting atop a hill at the intersection of the Outer Line of Defense with the Gulph Road, the National Memorial Arch dominates the southern portion of the park.  It is dedicated "to the officers and private soldiers of the Continental Army December 19, 1777 – June 19, 1778."  The arch was commissioned by an act of the 61st Congress in 1910 and completed in 1917. It is inscribed with George Washington's tribute to the perseverance and endurance of his army:

The drive is lined with large (~2 m high) memorial stones for each of the brigades, or "lines", that encamped there.  Crossing Gulph Road at the arch, the drive proceeds through the Pennsylvania Columns and past the hilltop statue of Anthony Wayne on horse.  More brigade stones line Port Kennedy Road.

Mount Joy Observation Tower

Atop Mount Joy, the highest elevation in the main park area, stood a steel observation tower.  The tower was closed in the 1980s because of deterioration, liability concerns, and the surrounding trees outgrowing the platform.  The tower was removed and shipped to a private area near Wellsboro, Pennsylvania, where people can still climb it. The area where it stood is now only accessible by foot trail,  the roads have been removed and the area is being given back to the woods.

Trails

The main trail is the Joseph Plumb Martin Trail, which encircles 8.7 miles of the park. Portions of regional trails, including the Horse Shoe Trail and the Schuylkill River Trail, also run through the park.

Recreation
The many trails in Valley Forge allow for different activities such as jogging, walking and biking. Other activities include horseback riding and canoeing/kayaking. There are three picnic areas located on the site. In addition, Park Rangers dressed in period uniforms are stationed as the Muhlenburg Brigade Huts and Washington's Headquarters, ready to inform visitors about the historic events that happened on the site. The Valley Forge 5-Mile Revolutionary Run is also held in the park every April.

Train station

Near Washington's Headquarters is the Valley Forge Train Station, owned by the park.  The station was completed in 1911 by the Reading Railroad and was the point of entry to the park for travelers who came by rail through the 1950s from Philadelphia,  distant. The station was restored in 2009 and is used as a museum and information center that offers visitors a better understanding of Washington's Headquarters and the village of Valley Forge. Constructed of the same type of stone as Washington's Headquarters, the building was erected on a large man-made embankment overlooking the headquarters site.

Near the visitor center is another station at Port Kennedy, on the same line. Also owned by the park, the station, both platforms and the former parking area are in a state of disrepair.

Modern problems

As a park in an increasingly urbanized area, Valley Forge faces problems including traffic, urban sprawl, and an overpopulation of white-tailed deer.

Valley Forge Park Road (PA Route 23), a heavily traveled two-lane commuter road, passes through the park and carries about six million vehicles per year of mostly commuter traffic.  Efforts to divert the traffic have thus far been unsuccessful, owing to existing traffic volume on alternate routes. A consortium of local governments and state and federal agencies are working on approaches to traffic congestion throughout the area, particularly improvements to US 422.

In 2001, a privately held  tract of land within the authorized park boundaries was offered for sale.  When the Park Service was unable to purchase it, it was sold to Toll Brothers, a real estate development company, for $2.5 million.  It took a grass roots campaign to get the Federal Government to purchase the land from the developer two years later, for $7.5 million.

In 2007, a non-profit organization – the American Revolution Center – purchased  of land within the park boundary with plans to construct a conference center, hotel, retail, campground and museum on the site. The National Parks Conservation Association and local citizens sued Lower Providence Township over the zoning change that enabled this proposal. The two parties agreed to allow NPS to keep the land, and in exchange, the American Revolution Center was given property in Philadelphia, where it built the Museum of the American Revolution.

An overpopulation of white-tailed deer has resulted in "changes in the species composition, abundance, and distribution of native plant communities and associated wildlife" in the park.  In 2008, the National Park Service released a draft deer management plan and environmental impact statement for public review. The intent of the controversial plan was to "support long-term protection, preservation, and restoration of native vegetation and other natural resources within the park."  Hunting is expressly prohibited by the legislation that created the park, and action by Congress would be required before it could be sanctioned. Since the plan was put into place, natural habitats have been restored and vegetation not seen in the park for decades has begun to return.

The park includes the site of the Ehret Magnesia Company, a former manufacturer of asbestos-insulated pipes.  Pre-existing dolomite quarries were subsequently backfilled with asbestos-containing slurry waste materials.  Those areas of the park are closed to visitors, and an effort is underway at permanent remediation.

Gallery

See also

Freedoms Foundation at Valley Forge
List of National Historic Landmarks in Pennsylvania

References

External links

Video showing various parts of the park from 2016

 
National Historical Park
National Historical Parks of the United States
National Historic Landmarks in Pennsylvania
Historic districts on the National Register of Historic Places in Pennsylvania
Historic American Buildings Survey in Pennsylvania
Historic American Engineering Record in Pennsylvania
Museums in Montgomery County, Pennsylvania
Museums in Chester County, Pennsylvania
Protected areas established in 1893
American Revolutionary War museums in Pennsylvania
National Park Service areas in Pennsylvania
Parks in Montgomery County, Pennsylvania
Parks in Chester County, Pennsylvania
History museums in Pennsylvania
Schuylkill River National and State Heritage Area
National Register of Historic Places in Chester County, Pennsylvania
National Register of Historic Places in Montgomery County, Pennsylvania
Parks on the National Register of Historic Places in Pennsylvania
American Revolution on the National Register of Historic Places
Upper Merion Township, Montgomery County, Pennsylvania
Protected areas of Chester County, Pennsylvania
Protected areas of Montgomery County, Pennsylvania
1893 establishments in Pennsylvania

pt:Vale Forge